The 20th Genie Awards were held in 2000 to honour films released in 1999. The ceremony was hosted by Patrick McKenna.

After the Academy of Canadian Cinema and Television decided to revise rules allowing films with only a minority of Canadian involvement in production to compete, Sunshine was nominated for 14 awards and Felicia's Journey was nominated for 10.

Nominees and winners
The Genie Award winner in each category is shown in bold text.

References

20
Genie
Genie